Amesbury is an unincorporated community in northern Alberta, Canada within Athabasca County. It has an elevation is 1,886 ft.

See also 
List of communities in Alberta

References 

Localities in Athabasca County